Quincy Taylor Brown (born June 4, 1991) is an American actor and singer who performs under the mononym Quincy. He starred in the 2015 film Brotherly Love and released a song called "Friends First".  He also had a co-starring role on the television musical drama Star. He is the son of former model Kim Porter and singer, songwriter and record producer Al B. Sure!.

Early life 
Quincy was named after his godfather, music and entertainment icon Quincy Jones, Al B Sure!’s mentor. In 1994, when he was three, his mother began a relationship with Sean "Diddy" Combs and Diddy eventually became an informal step father to Quincy and raised him as his own. The couple had three more children together, a son, Christian, and twin daughters D'Lila and Jessie. For his 16th birthday, Diddy and Porter threw Quincy a celebrity studded party in Atlanta that was featured on MTV's My Super Sweet 16. His family moved around often but he spent most of his youth in Columbus, Georgia and later moved to Los Angeles, California in his final years of high school and completed his education at Calabasas High School.

Career 
Quincy made his acting debut as Reggie in the 2012 film We the Party. 
In addition to being an actor and musician Quincy has embarked into other ventures including modeling  and directing.
In August 2012, Quincy walked in the Gaborone Fashion Weekend event in Botswana.
In January 2015, Quincy played the role of Jaleel in the film Dope.
On February 19, 2015, he walked in Naomi Campbell's Ebola awareness show during New York Fashion Week.

In June 2015, Quincy made his directorial debut with the music video for singer and actress Elle Winter's song No Words.
In 2016, he was cast in a recurring  role as Daylon in the television show  The Haves and the Have Nots. In February 2016, Quincy appeared in a campaign for the sneaker brand Creative Recreation.
On June 23, 2016, Quincy announced that he had signed a record deal with Bad Boy/Epic Records. Also in 2016, he collaborated with the U.K fashion brand BoohooMan for their Autumn/Winter capsule collection and was the face of the campaign 
On Valentines Day in 2017, Quincy released his first E.P entitled “This Is For You”. It included songs like Sunshine and I can tell you. In 2018, he starred alongside Kat Graham as Josh in the Netflix original film The Holiday Calendar.

From 2016 to 2019, Quincy was cast in a lead role as Derek Jones on the television series Star.
In 2019, Quincy directed and starred in Run Loubi Run, a short film for the fashion house Christian Louboutin’s first ever social media campaign.
Also in 2019, Quincy was used by the luxe brand MCM Worldwide to launch its Sleep and Loungewear collection.
In 2020, he was part of a fashion campaign for the Coach and Bape collaboration and became the first male celebrity spokesperson for Coach New York watches.

Quincy had a recurring role in the 2021, television drama Power Book III: Raising Kanan. He formerly played a character called Crown Camacho. In July 2021, Quincy was featured in the campaign for Ivy Park and Adidas’s "Flex Park" collection. Also in 2021, he was in the campaign for Montblanc and Masion Kitsuné’s capsule collection and was used by Lacoste for the brands promotion of its L001 sneaker launch.
Quincy has appeared in magazines and has been featured in several online publications such as Vogue.com and Forbes.com.

Business ventures 
He is the founder of the production company FourXample. He also has a watch line called Chalk by Quincy, a jeans collection with Embellish and a start-up technology company. In 2019, Quincy developed and launched a picture editing app called Fresh Crop

Accolades 
April 24 is designated as Quincy Brown day by the mayor of Columbus, Georgia Teresa Pike Tomlinson.

Filmography

Film

Television

Music video appearances

Discography

Extended plays

Singles

Guest appearances

References

External links 
 

1991 births
Living people
African-American male actors
21st-century African-American male singers
American male pop singers
African-American songwriters
American male film actors
American male television actors
American rhythm and blues singer-songwriters
Male actors from New York City
Singers from New York City
21st-century American singers
21st-century American male singers
American male singer-songwriters
Singer-songwriters from New York (state)